Hard Luck Mary is a 1934 German comedy film directed by Erich Engel and starring Jenny Jugo, Friedrich Benfer, and Willi Schur.

The film's sets were designed by the art director Emil Hasler and Arthur Schwarz. In 1935 it was released in the United States by Fox Film

Cast

References

Bibliography

External links 
 

1934 films
1934 comedy films
German comedy films
Films of Nazi Germany
1930s German-language films
Films directed by Erich Engel
German black-and-white films
Fox Film films
1930s American films
1930s German films